The Biak scops owl (Otus beccarii) is a species of owl endemic to the twin islands of Biak-Supiori in Cenderawasih Bay, Papua, Indonesia. 

It is classified as Vulnerable due to its very small range and destruction of its habitat. 

Biak scops owls are 20–25 cm in length. They have dark brown and dark rufous forms with long ear-tufts and pale a whitish-brown facial disc. They are very small creatures, but have hoarse, corvid-like voices. Their diet mostly consists of small vertebrates or insects. Most are found on Biak and Supiori in heavily wooded areas near villages. They are seldom seen, and little is known about their reproduction.

References

BirdLife Species Factsheet - Biak Scops-owl
Owl pages

Otus (bird)
Birds of the Schouten Islands
Birds described in 1876
Endemic fauna of the Biak–Numfoor rain forests